Galaxy 19 is a communications satellite owned by Intelsat located at 97° West longitude, serving the North American market. Galaxy 19 replaced Galaxy 25 which is nearing the end of its design life and has been moved to 93.1°W longitude. It was built by Space Systems/Loral, as part of its FS-1300 line.  Galaxy 19 was formerly known as Intelsat Americas 9 and was successfully launched September 24, 2008. It provides services in the C band and Ku band.

The clients for Galaxy 19 include the previous clients for Galaxy 25. Expanded services include higher-powered C-band and Ku band transponders as well as new, high-power Ka band service. As of August 2017, Galaxy 19 broadcast 172 free-to-air channels for North American televisions, from a diverse list of national and international sources.

Galaxy 19 was launched using Sea Launch.

References

External links
 Galaxy 19 at www.gn.rs 
Galaxy 19 at Sathint  
Galaxy 19 at Satbeams

Communications satellites in geostationary orbit
Satellite television
Spacecraft launched in 2008
Spacecraft launched by Zenit and Energia rockets
Satellites using the SSL 1300 bus